Live at Brixton Academy (or Live at the Brixton Academy) is the name given to a number of live music albums and videos by various artists, recorded at the Brixton Academy in London. Such albums have included:

You Fat Bastards: Live at the Brixton Academy, a 1991 live album by Faith No More, recorded in 1990
A New Decade: Live from Brixton Academy, a 1990 live album by Soul II Soul, recorded in 1990
Live at the Brixton Academy (Brian May album), 1994
Live at Brixton Academy (Atari Teenage Riot album), 1999
Live at Brixton Academy (Motörhead album), 2003, recorded in 2000
Savage – Live at Brixton Academy, a 2018 live album by Gary Numan
Live at Brixton Academy, a 2003 live DVD by the Inspiral Carpets
Live at Brixton Academy, a 2004 Good Charlotte DVD
Live at Brixton Academy (Dido album), a 2005 live album and DVD, recorded in 2004
Live at Brixton Academy (Pendulum album), a 2009 live album and DVD
The Poison: Live at Brixton, a 2006 live DVD by Bullet For My Valentine
Chase & Status: Live at Brixton, a 2011 live album and DVD by Chase & Status

See also
Other albums recorded at Brixton Academy
Other videos recorded at Brixton Academy